The  (German: 'Berlin Transport Company') is the main public transport company of Berlin, the capital city of Germany. It manages the city's  underground railway, tram, bus, replacement services (EV) and ferry networks, but not the  urban rail system.

The generally used abbreviation, BVG, has been retained from the company's original name,  (Berlin Transportation Stock Company). Subsequently, the company was renamed . After reunification, the current formal name was adopted.

History 

On 1 January 1938, the company was renamed , but the acronym BVG was retained.

In 1933, the State Commissioner for Berlin, Julius Lippert, appointed the NSDAP politician and later Waffen SS soldier Johannes Engel as head of the BVG Supervisory Board. The board of directors and most of the senior staff were dismissed or disempowered. During World War II, the BVG used some 4000 forced laborers, for whom the company built its own barracks camp.

From 1 August 1949, the BVG networks in West Berlin and East Berlin were operated separately.

Prior to the division of Berlin, tram lines existed throughout the city, but  abandoned all the tram lines in its part of the city, replacing them all by buses by 1967. However  retained its tram lines, and on the reunification of Berlin the BVG inherited a considerable network of routes in the eastern half of Berlin.

On 9 January 1984,  took over the responsibility for operation of the  services in West Berlin.

 also took part in the Berlin  project, an urban maglev system, in the period between 1984 and 1992. The project used a section of the  right of way that was out of service due to the building of the Berlin Wall, and was dropped with the fall of that wall.
 

In September 2019, BVG launched first in the world large scale Mobility as a service project “Jelbi”  together with a Lithuanian mobility startup Trafi.

Chief executive officers

Operations

Trains run every two to five minutes during peak hours, every five minutes for the rest of the day and every ten minutes in the evening and on Sunday.

 service is provided by 1266 carriages, of which 500 are used on the earlier small-profile lines (U1 to U4) and 766 are used on the later large-profile lines. These cars travel 132 million km (83 million miles), carrying 400 million passengers, over the year.

Trams

These  tram lines are recognisable by an M prefix to their route number, and are the only tram routes to operate 24 hours a day.

Tram service is provided by 391 carriages, of which 154 are modern low floor carriages and 237 are older carriages. Virtually all of the remaining network is within the confines of the former East Berlin, as all the routes in the former West Berlin were abandoned during the period of the city's partition. However, there have been some extensions of routes across the former border since reunification, most remarkably to the city's new main railway station  (lines M5, M8 and M10).

Buses

Like the  tram routes, these  routes can be recognised by an M prefix to their route number. A further 13 BVG-operated bus routes are express routes with an X prefix to their route number.

BVG bus service is provided by a fleet of 1349 buses, of which no fewer than 407 are double-decker buses. Whilst such buses are common in Ireland and the United Kingdom, their use elsewhere in Europe is extremely uncommon.

Route 218 is partially operated by ex-BVG vintage vehicles now in preservation but used in revenue-earning service.

Ferries 

Berlin has an extensive network of waterways within its city boundaries, including the Havel, Spree and Dahme rivers, and many linked lakes and canals. These are crossed by six passenger ferry routes that are operated by the BVG.

Fares 
This body provides a common fare structure that allows travel on various operators in and around Berlin.

All BVG services form part of the VBB's common public transport fare structure. This covers the city of Berlin and approximately  beyond the city boundaries. The area is split into three zones. Zone A is the central parts of the city (inside the ), and zone B is the outer parts of Berlin City. Zone C covers an area beyond the city boundaries. Ticket fares have a slight price difference between these three zones. For instance in June 2010, a one-day ticket for zone A+B was priced at €6.10, a zone B+C one-day travel ticket was €6.30, and for all three zones A+B+C, the price was €6.50.

Media

The  is a monthly published overview of planned line deviations and changes due to construction measures or events. In addition, it offers alternatives to avoid them and informs about line and timetable adjustments. It is enclosed with the PLUS magazine. The first edition was published in August 2013.

PLUS
PLUS is the monthly customer magazine of the BVG. The 40-page booklet is available in buses, trams and subway stations, among other places.

Subsidiaries

& Co. KG
 & Co. KG (BBH) as the managing holding company has the task of managing the investment companies administratively and strategically and to provide commercial services for the affiliated companies as well as to carry out the investment management for the BVG. On the basis of BBH offers services in the areas of human resources, finance, accounting, controlling, IT and insurance. In addition, their 100% participations include cash pooling and profit transfer agreements. These include the BT, URBANIS and IOB.

(BBV) manages BBH's business as a general partner exclusively.

BT Berlin Transport 
Berlin Transport (BT)'s core business is to provide bus and subway services for the BVG. In addition, the company provides occasional travel services for both — the BVG and third parties.

URBANIS 
The core business of URBANIS is the development and rental of commercial usable areas, especially in the area of Berlin subway stations.

The core business of the IOB consists in the control of the remote bus procedures as well as the economic use of the real estate on the ZOB.

is a wholly owned subsidiary of BVG and was in charge of the closure of the gap in the  subway line in Berlin, in particular project management and controlling as well as project marketing for the BVG.

(BVG-FFG) was founded on 1 January 2016 as a 100% subsidiary of the BVG. As a result of the organizational separation between the core business of the BVG and rail vehicle procurement, the assignment for financing and realization of vehicle procurement by the BVG-FFG. As part of to financing the procurement of metro and tram vehicles, it is entitled to a comprehensive representation of the BVG and trades in the name and on account of the BVG. The tasks of the society include the admission of credits to financing the rail vehicle procurement of the BVG, the financing management and the provision of procurement finance and accounting services including controlling.

See also 
 Transport in Berlin

References

External links 

 
 Tram Travels:  (BVG)

Transport in Berlin
Rail transport in Berlin
Berlin U-Bahn